Layjand (also Romanized as Lāyjand and Lāyjond; also known as Lāgund, Lā’ījond, Lārījand, and Lījand) is a village in Cheshmeh Sar Rural District, in the Central District of Khansar County, Isfahan Province, Iran. At the 2006 census, its population was 163, in 54 families.

References 

Populated places in Khansar County